Vahur is a masculine Estonian given name and may refer to:

Vahur Afanasjev (1979–2021), Estonian writer, filmmaker and musician
Vahur Glaase (born 1960), Estonian politician
Vahur Kersna (born 1962), Estonian journalist, radio and television personality and caricaturist
Vahur Kraft (born 1961), Estonian banker
Vahur Murulaid (born 1967), Estonian military lieutenant colonel
Vahur Sova (born 1956), Estonian architect
Vahur Vahtramäe (born 1976), Estonian footballer
Vahur Väljamäe  (born 1968), Estonian military soldier

As a surname:

Britta Vahur (born 1984), Estonian actress

Estonian masculine given names